Hypericum psilophytum is a species of flowering plant of the St. John's wort family (Hypericaceae) that is found in Morocco and Algeria.

Taxonomy 
The placement of H. psilophytum within Hypericum can be summarized as follows:

Hypericum
 Hypericum subg. Hypericum
 Hypericum sect. Adenosepalum
 subsect. Adenosepalum
 subsect. Aethiopica
 Huber-Morathii group
 subsect. Caprifolia
 H. caprifolium
 H. coadunatum
 H. collenetteae
 H. naudinianum
 H. psilophytum
 H. pubescens
 H. scruglii
 H. sinaicum
 H. somaliense
 H. tomentosum

References 

psilophytum
Taxa named by Ludwig Diels